This list of lakes of Denmark includes the largest lakes in Denmark

Largest lakes of Denmark

Largest lakes by area

Lakes larger than 5 hectares 
Denmark has approximately 120,000 lakes and ponds with an area of 0.1 hectares and more.  Of these, 1,032 lakes have an official name.

A
 Arresø
 Arreskov Lake

B
 Bagsværd Sø 
 Barup Sø 
 Bastrup Sø 
 Bechers Sø 
 Brokholm Sø 
 Buresø 
 Bølling Sø

D
 Damhus Sø 
 Donssøerne 
 Dybesø

E
 Emdrup Lake
 Esrum Sø

F
 Farum Sø 
 Ferring Sø 
 Filsø
 Fuglsang Sø 
 Furesø 
 Fussing Sø 
 Fårup Sø

G
 Gentofte Lake 
Gribsø
 Grynderup Sø 
 Gråsten Slotssø 
 Gurre Sø
 Gødstrup Sø

H
 Haderslev Dam 
 Hald Sø 
 Hampen Sø 
 Hejrede Sø
 Hinge Sø 
 Horn Sø 
 Hovedsø 
 Hunesø

J
 Jystrup Sø

K
 Karlsgårde Sø 
 Kilen 
 Klejtrup Sø

L
 Legind Sø 
 Louns Sø 
 Lund Fjord 
 Lyngby Sø

M
 Madum
 Maribosøerne

N
 Nordborg Sø 
 Nors Sø 
 Nørresø (Maribosøerne) 
 Nørresø (Viborg)

O
 Oldenor

R
 Ring Sø 
 Røgbølle Sø 
 Rørbæk Sø

S
 Sjælsø
 Sjørring Sø 
 Slivsø 
 Solbjerg Engsø 
 Stadil Fjord 
 Store Grankule
 Store Kattinge Sø 
 Stubbe Sø 
 Sunds Sø 
 Søby Sø 
 Søbygård Sø 
 Søerne 
 Sønder Lem Vig 
 Søndersø (Maribosøerne) 
 Søndersø (Nordsjælland) 
 Søndersø (Viborg)

T
 Teglgård Sø 
 Tissø 
 Tjele Langsø 
 Tofte Sø 
 Tuelsø 
 Tversted-søerne 
 Tystrup Sø

U
 Uglesø

V
 Vandet Sø 
 Vandkraftsøen 
 Vedsø
 Vejlesø 
 Vessø 
 Viborgsøerne 
 Vilsted Sø

See also

 List of forests in Denmark

References

Denmark
Lakes